The Black Boys, also known as the Brave Fellows and the Loyal Volunteers, were members of a white settler movement in the Conococheague Valley of colonial Pennsylvania sometimes known as the Black Boys Rebellion. The Black Boys, named because they blackened their faces during raids, were upset with traders attempting to break provincial laws by delivering "warlike goods" to Native Americans during Pontiac's War. Many settlers of the Conococheague Valley were outraged, having suffered greatly from Indian raids during the war. The 1764 Enoch Brown School Massacre, in which ten school children had been killed and scalped, was the most notorious example of these raids.

Led by James "Black Boy Jimmy" Smith, the Black Boys—dressed as Indians—confiscated and destroyed a number of supply wagons that were headed to Fort Pitt on March 6, 1765. Some of the items in the supply wagons were official diplomatic presents, necessary for making peace with Native Americans at Fort Pitt. Other items, however, were trade goods sent by Indian trader  George Croghan, who was seeking to recoup his losses from the French and Indian War. Croghan had secretly (and illegally) included rum and gunpowder in the shipments in order to make a profit once trade with the Indians was legally resumed.

Despite the fact that the shipment contained illegal trade goods, British army officers at nearby Fort Loudoun were bribed and sided with Croghan and the traders. Using American Indian raiding tactics, the Black Boys continued to prevent shipments from moving through the valley, and Fort Loudoun was surrounded and fired upon on several occasions.

Tensions dissipated after formal peace in Pontiac's War had been established, but in 1769, when another war with Native Americans seemed imminent, Black Boys again stopped another wagon train. After British troops arrested several of the Black Boys and imprisoned them in Fort Bedford, James Smith and the Black Boys surprised and captured the fort on September 12, 1769. No one was harmed, and the prisoners were set free. (This capture of Fort Bedford is documented only in Smith's autobiography, so it may be a tall tale, although historian Gregory Evans Dowd notes that there is some corroborating evidence, and some other historians believe the tale to be true.) Troops were sent to arrest Smith, and in a struggle a friend of Smith was shot and killed. Smith was arrested and charged with manslaughter, but was acquitted, as there were doubts that it was his weapon that had killed the man.

The Black Boys were similar to the earlier Paxton Boys in their hostility to the British Crown and the colonial government, but the Black Boys did not target Native Americans in their actions. According to historian Gregory Evans Dowd, a number of historians have confused the two movements. The Black Boys Rebellion has generally been forgotten, overshadowed in American historiography by the 1765 Stamp Act crisis. Nevertheless, some historians see the Black Boys Rebellion as a precursor to the American Revolution.

A fictionalized version of the Black Boys Rebellion was depicted in the 1939 Hollywood film Allegheny Uprising, starring John Wayne as James Smith. The film was based on the 1937 boys' history The First Rebel: Being a lost chapter of our history and a true narrative of America's first uprising against English military authority, by Neil H. Swanson.

References
Dixon, David. Never Come to Peace Again: Pontiac's Uprising and the Fate of the British Empire in North America. Norman: University of Oklahoma Press, 2005. . 
Dowd, Gregory Evans. War Under Heaven: Pontiac, the Indian Nations, & the British Empire. Johns Hopkins University Press, 2002. .
Smith, James. Colonel James Smith's Life Among the Delawares, 1755-1759, in Captives Among the Indians: First-hand Narratives of Indian Wars, Customs, Tortures, and Habits of Life in Colonial Times, edited by Horace Kephart, Outing Publishing, New York, 1915.  Available at Google Books
Swanson, Neil H. The First Rebel: Being a lost chapter of our history and a true narrative of America's first uprising against English military authority. New York: Farrar & Rinehart, 1937.  Available at   Internet Archive

External links
"Captain James Smith and the Black Boys", Fort Loudon Monument Dedicatory Services, 1916

Pontiac's War
History of Franklin County, Pennsylvania
1760s riots
1765 in Pennsylvania
1769 in Pennsylvania
Rebellions in the United States
Pre-statehood history of Pennsylvania